The 2022 Arkansas State Red Wolves football team respresented the Arkansas State University as a member of the Sun Belt Conference during the 2022 NCAA Division I FBS football season. They were be led by head coach Butch Jones, in his second season with the team. The Red Wolves played their home games at Centennial Bank Stadium in Jonesboro, Arkansas.

Previous season

Preseason

Recruiting class

Sun Belt coaches poll
The Sun Belt coaches poll was released on July 25, 2022. The Red Wolves were picked to finish sixth in the West Division.

Sun Belt Preseason All-Conference teams

Offense

2nd team
Te'Vailance Hunt – Wide Receiver, SR

Defense

1st team
Kivon bennett – Linebacker, RS-SR

Special teams

1st team
Johnnie lang – Right Safety, RS-SR

Personnel

Schedule
Arkansas State and the Sun Belt Conference announced the 2022 football schedule on March 1, 2022.

Game summaries

Grambling State

at No. 3 Ohio State

at Memphis

at Old Dominion

Statistics

Louisiana-Monroe

James Madison

at Southern Miss

at Louisiana

South Alabama

UMass

at Texas State

Troy

References

Arkansas State
Arkansas State Red Wolves football seasons
Arkansas State Red Wolves football